The Mercedes-Benz M02 engine is a naturally-aspirated, 2.0-liter, straight-6, internal combustion piston engine, designed, developed and produced by Mercedes-Benz; between 1926 and 1933.

M02 engine
Power was transmitted via a three-speed manual transmission to the rear wheels, which were fixed to a rigid axle suspended from semi-elliptic leaf springs. The braking applied to all four wheels, mechanically controlled using rod linkages.

Applications
Mercedes-Benz W02

References

Mercedes-Benz engines
Straight-six engines
Engines by model
Gasoline engines by model